Vachellia macracantha is a species of tree in the family Fabaceae. Its native range spans from southern Florida to South America.

References 

Flora of Florida
Flora of Central America
Flora of South America
Trees of Peru
Trees of Nicaragua
Trees of Puerto Rico
macracantha